LPD433 (low power device 433 MHz) is a UHF band in which license free communication devices are allowed to operate in some regions. The frequencies correspond with the ITU region 1 ISM band of 433.050 MHz to 434.790 MHz, and operation is limited to CEPT countries. The frequencies used are within the 70-centimeter band, which is currently reserved for government and amateur radio operations in the United States and most nations worldwide.

LPD hand-held radios are authorized for licence-free voice communications use in most of Europe using analog frequency modulation (FM) as part of short range device regulations, with 25 kHz channel spacing, for a total of 69 channels. In some countries, LPD devices may only be used with an integral and non-removable antenna with a maximum legal power output of 10 mW.

Voice communication in the LPD band was introduced to reduce the burden on the eight (now sixteen) PMR446 channels over shorter ranges (less than 1 km).

LPD is also used in vehicle key-less entry device, garage or gate openers and some outdoor home weather station products.

Usage by country

ITU Region 1 (Europe)

United Kingdom

In the UK, LPD433 equipment that meets the respective Ofcom Interface Requirement can be used for model control, analogue/digitised voice and remote keyless entry systems. There is significant scope for interference however, both on frequency and on adjacent frequencies, as the band is far from free. The frequencies from 430 to 440 MHz are allocated on a secondary basis to licensed radio amateurs who are allowed to use up to 40 W (16 dBW) between 430 and 432 MHz and 400 W (26 dBW) between 432 and 440 MHz. Channels 1 to 14 are UK amateur repeater outputs and channels 62 to 69 are UK amateur repeater inputs. This band is shared on a secondary basis for both licensed and licence exempt users, with the primary user being the Ministry of Defence.

Ofcom, together with the  RSGB Emerging Technology Co-ordination Committee have produced guidelines to help mitigate the side effects of interference to an extent.

Switzerland

Switzerland permits the use of all 69 LPD433 channels with a maximum power output of 10 mW.

Spain 

According to a recently published (June 2021) resolution of the Spanish government, where it defines 'interface IR-266', non-specific mobile short-range devices may be used without authorization for voice applications with 'advanced mitigation techniques' (such as listening before talking) from 434.040 to 434.790 MHz, with channels narrower than 25 kHz and with a maximum 'apparent radiated power' of 10 mW. This would make the use of LPD433 channels 40 to 69 possible in Spain.

Other European countries

European remote keyless entry systems often use the 433 MHz band, although, as in all of Europe, these frequencies are within the 70-centimeter band allocated to amateur radio, and interference results. In Germany, before the end of 2008, radio control enthusiasts were able to use frequencies from channel 03 through 67  for radio control of any form of model (air or ground-based), all with odd channel numbers (03, 05, etc. up to ch. 67), with each sanctioned frequency having 50 kHz of bandwidth separation between each adjacent channel.

ITU Region 2 (America)

In ITU region 2 (the Americas), the frequencies that LPD433 uses are also within the 70-centimeter band allocated to amateur radio. In the United States LPD433 radios can only be used under FCC amateur regulations by properly licensed amateur radio operators.

ITU Region 3

Malaysia

In Malaysia, this band is also within the 70-centimeter band (430.000 – 440.000 MHz) allocated to amateur radio. Class B amateur radio holders are permitted to transmit up to 50 watts PEP power level. There is no licence requirement for LPD as long as it complies with requirement regulated by Malaysian Communications And Multimedia Commission (MCMC). As regulated by MCMC in Technical Code for Short Range Devices, remote control and security device are allowed up to 50 mW ERP and up to 100 mW ERP for Short Range Communication (SRC) devices. RFID are allowed up to 100 mW EIRP.

Channels

See also
PMR446
Personal radio service
Family Radio Service
General Mobile Radio Service
 Part 15
 ISM band
 NTIA Manual of Regulations and Procedures for Federal Radio Frequency Management

References

Bandplans